The women's triple jump event at the 1996 World Junior Championships in Athletics was held in Sydney, Australia, at International Athletic Centre on 24 and 25 August.

Medalists

Results

Final
25 August

Qualifications
24 Aug

Group A

Group B

Participation
According to an unofficial count, 25 athletes from 21 countries participated in the event.

References

Triple jump
Triple jump at the World Athletics U20 Championships